The Lasiocampinae are a subfamily of the moth family Lasiocampidae. The subfamily was described by Thaddeus William Harris in 1841.

Genera